This is a list of schools in Yau Tsim Mong District, Hong Kong.

Secondary schools

 Government
 Queen Elizabeth School
 Sir Ellis Kadoorie Secondary School (West Kowloon)

 Aided
  (中華基督教會銘基書院)
 ELCHK Lutheran Secondary School (基督教香港信義會信義中學)
  (港九潮州公會中學)
 Lai Chack Middle School (麗澤中學)
 LKWFSL Lau Wong Fat Secondary School (世界龍岡學校劉皇發中學)
 Methodist College (循道中學)
  (天主教新民書院)
 PLK Vicwood KT Chong Sixth Form College (保良局莊啓程預科書院)
 St Francis Xavier's College (聖芳濟書院)
 St Mary's Canossian College (嘉諾撒聖瑪利書院)
 True Light Girls' College (真光女書院)
 Wah Yan College, Kowloon (華仁書院（九龍）)

 Direct Subsidy Scheme
 Diocesan Girls' School (拔萃女書院)
 HKMA David Li Kwok Po College (香港管理專業協會李國寶中學)
  (九龍三育中學)

 Caput
  (聖公會諸聖中學)

 Private
  (香港凱莉山學校)
 Rudolf Steiner Education Foundation Hong Kong Maria College (香港華德福教育基金會瑪利亞書院)
 St. Gloria College (Kowloon) (聖迦利亞書院（九龍）)

Primary schools

 Government
 Canton Road Government Primary School (廣東道官立小學)
 Jordan Road Government Primary School (佐敦道官立小學)
 Tong Mei Road Government Primary School (塘尾道官立小學)

 Aided
 CCC Heep Woh Primary School (中華基督教會協和小學)
 CCC Kei Tsun Primary School (中華基督教會基全小學)
 CCC Wanchai Church Kei To Primary School (中華基督教會灣仔堂基道小學)
 Fresh Fish Traders' School (鮮魚行學校)
 Kowloon Women's Welfare Club Li Ping Memorial School (九龍婦女福利會李炳紀念學校)
 Methodist School (循道學校)
 Sharon Lutheran School (路德會沙崙學校)
 SKH Kei Wing Primary School (聖公會基榮小學)
 St Mary's Canossian School (嘉諾撒聖瑪利學校)
 Tai Kok Tsui Catholic Primary School (大角嘴天主教小學)
 Tak Sun School (德信學校)
 TKT Catholic Primary School (Hoi Fan Road) (大角嘴天主教小學（海帆道）)
 Tung Koon District Society Fong Shu Chuen School (東莞同鄉會方樹泉學校)
 TWGH Lo Yu Chik Primary School (東華三院羅裕積小學)
 Yaumati Catholic Primary School (Hoi Wang Road) (油蔴地天主教小學（海泓道）)
 Yaumati Catholic Primary School (油蔴地天主教小學)
 Yaumati Kaifong Association School (油蔴地街坊會學校)

 Direct Subsidy Scheme
 G. T. (Ellen Yeung) College (優才（楊殷有娣）書院)
 PLK Camoes Tan Siu Lin Primary School (保良局陳守仁小學)

 Private
 Dalton School Hong Kong (香港道爾頓學校)
 Diocesan Girls' Junior School (拔萃女小學)
 Mount Kelly School Hong Kong (香港凱莉山學校)
 VNSAA St. Hilary's School (漢師德萃學校)

Special schools

 Aided
 Hong Kong Red Cross Hospital Schools Kwong Wah Hospital (香港紅十字會醫院學校)
 Hong Kong Red Cross Hospital Schools Queen Elizabeth Hospital (香港紅十字會醫院學校)
 TWGHS Chi-li Pao School (東華三院包玉星學校)

References

Lists of schools in Hong Kong
Yau Tsim Mong District